Kõpu is a small borough in Viljandi County, Estonia. It was the administrative centre of Kõpu Parish.

Suure-Kõpu manor

Suure-Kõpu manor, located in the village, has a history that goes back to 1487. During the larger part of its history it belonged to different Baltic aristocratic families. After Estonia gained its independence in 1919, the manor began to be used as a school house. The current building was erected in 1847 and is one of the latest classicist manor houses to be built in Estonia. The rather large manor house shows close resemblance with the Kuremaa manor house, which was built by the same architect, Emil Julius Strauss. The manor house was, from the outset, lavishly decorated inside with frescoes and wall-paintings in classicist style, and at a later time Art Nouveau decoration in Papier-mâché and imitation stucco were added. However, during the Soviet occupation of Estonia, these decorations were deemed unfitting and painted over. They were re-discovered in the 1970s and have in recent years been painstakingly restored.

Notable people
Allain Tikko, army officer (1979-2009) killed in Afghanistan

Gallery

See also
 List of palaces and manor houses in Estonia

References

External links
Suure-Kõpu manor at Estonian Manors Portal

Boroughs and small boroughs in Estonia
Kreis Fellin